Colvin Creek may refer to:

Colvin Creek (Current River), a stream in Missouri
Colvin Creek (Eleven Point River), a stream in Missouri